Catherine of Siena, TOSD (Italian: Caterina da Siena; 25 March 1347 – 29 April 1380) was an Italian  member of the Third Order of Saint Dominic in the Roman Catholic  Church. She was a mystic, activist, and author who had a great influence on Italian literature and on the Catholic Church. Canonized in 1461, she is also a Doctor of the Church.

Born and raised in Siena, she wanted from an early age to devote herself to God, against the will of her parents. She joined the "mantellates", a group of pious women, primarily widows, informally devoted to Dominican spirituality. Her influence with Pope Gregory XI played a role in his 1376 decision to leave Avignon for Rome. The Pope then sent Catherine to  negotiate peace with Florence. After Gregory XI's death (March 1378) and the conclusion of peace (July 1378), she returned to Siena. She dictated to secretaries her set of spiritual treatises The Dialogue of Divine Providence. The  Great Schism of the West led Catherine of Siena to go to Rome with the pope. She sent numerous letters to princes and cardinals to promote obedience to Pope Urban VI and to defend what she calls the "vessel of the Church". She died on 29 April 1380, exhausted by her rigorous fasting. Urban VI celebrated her funeral and burial in the Basilica of Santa Maria sopra Minerva in Rome.

Devotion around Catherine of Siena developed rapidly after her death. Pope Pius II canonized her in 1461; she was declared a patron saint of Rome in 1866 by Pope Pius IX, and of Italy (together with Francis of Assisi) in 1939 by Pope Pius XII. She was the second woman  to be declared a "Doctor of the Church," on 4 October 1970 by Pope Paul VI – only days after Teresa of Ávila.

Catherine of Siena is one of the outstanding figures of medieval Catholicism, by the strong influence she has had in the history of the papacy and her extensive authorship. She was behind the return of the Pope from Avignon to Rome, and then carried out many missions entrusted to her by the pope, something quite rare for a woman in the Middle Ages. Her Dialogue, hundreds of letters, and dozens of prayers, also give her a prominent place in the history of Italian literature.

Life

Caterina di Jacopo di Benincasa was born on 25 March 1347 (shortly before the Black Death ravaged Europe) in Siena, Republic of Siena (today Italy), to Lapa Piagenti, the daughter of a local poet, and Jacopo di Benincasa, a cloth dyer who ran his enterprise with the help of his sons. The house where Catherine grew up still exists. Lapa was about forty years old when she gave premature birth to twin daughters Catherine and Giovanna. She had already borne 22 children, but half of them had died. Giovanna was handed over to a wet-nurse and died soon after. Catherine was nursed by her mother and developed into a healthy child. She was two years old when Lapa had her 25th child, another daughter named Giovanna. As a child Catherine was so merry that the family gave her the pet name of "Euphrosyne", which is Greek for "joy" and the name of an Euphrosyne of Alexandria.

Catherine is said by her confessor and biographer Raymond of Capua O.P.'s Life to have had her first vision of Christ when she was five or six years old: she and a brother were on the way home from visiting a married sister when she is said to have experienced a vision of Christ seated in glory with the Apostles Peter, Paul, and John. Raymond continues that at age seven, Catherine vowed to give her whole life to God.

When Catherine was sixteen, her older sister Bonaventura died in childbirth; already anguished by this, Catherine soon learned that her parents wanted her to marry Bonaventura's widower. She was absolutely opposed and started a strict fast. She had learned this from Bonaventura, whose husband had been far from considerate but his wife had changed his attitude by refusing to eat until he showed better manners. Besides fasting, Catherine further disappointed her mother by cutting off her long hair as a protest against being overly encouraged to improve her appearance to attract a husband.
 
Catherine would later advise Raymond of Capua to do during times of trouble what she did now as a teenager: "Build a cell inside your mind, from which you can never flee." In this inner cell she made her father into a representation of Christ, her mother into the Blessed Virgin Mary, and her brothers into the apostles. Serving them humbly became an opportunity for spiritual growth. Catherine resisted the accepted course of marriage and motherhood on the one hand, or a nun's veil on the other. She chose to live an active and prayerful life outside a convent's walls following the model of the Dominicans. Eventually her father gave up and permitted her to live as she pleased.

A vision of Dominic de Guzmán gave strength to Catherine, but her wish to join his order was no comfort to Lapa, who took her daughter with her to the baths in Bagno Vignoni to improve her health. Catherine fell seriously ill with a violent rash, fever and pain, which conveniently made her mother accept her wish to join the "Mantellate", the local association of devout women. The Mantellate taught Catherine how to read, and she lived in almost total silence and solitude in the family home.

Her custom of giving away clothing and food without asking anyone's permission cost her family significantly, but she requested nothing for herself. By staying in their midst, she could live out her rejection of them more strongly. She did not want their food, referring to the table laid for her in Heaven with her real family. 

According to Raymond of Capua, at the age of twenty-one (c. 1368), Catherine experienced what she described in her letters as a "Mystical Marriage" with Jesus, later a popular subject in art as the Mystic marriage of Saint Catherine. Caroline Walker Bynum explains one surprising and controversial aspect of this marriage that occurs both in artistic representations of the event and in some early accounts of her life: "Underlining the extent to which the marriage was a fusion with Christ's physicality [...] Catherine received, not the ring of gold and jewels that her biographer reports in his bowdlerized version, but the ring of Christ's foreskin." Catherine herself mentions the foreskin-as-wedding ring motif in one of her letters (#221), equating the wedding ring of a virgin with a foreskin; she typically claimed that her own wedding ring to Christ was simply invisible. She wrote in a letter (to encourage a nun who seems to have been undergoing a prolonged period of spiritual trial and torment): "Bathe in the blood of Christ crucified. See that you don't look for or want anything but the crucified, as a true bride ransomed by the blood of Christ crucified – for that is my wish. You see very well that you are a bride and that he has espoused you – you and everyone else – and not with a ring of silver but with a ring of his own flesh. Look at the tender little child who on the eighth day, when he was circumcised, gave up just so much flesh as to make a tiny circlet of a ring!" Raymond of Capua also records that she was told by Christ to leave her withdrawn life and enter the public life of the world. Catherine rejoined her family and began helping the ill and the poor, where she took care of them in hospitals or homes. Her early pious activities in Siena attracted a group of followers, women and men, who gathered around her.

As social and political tensions mounted in Siena, Catherine found herself drawn to intervene in wider politics. She made her first journey to Florence in 1374, probably to be interviewed by the Dominican authorities at the General Chapter held in Florence in May 1374, though this is disputed (if she was interviewed, then the absence of later evidence suggests she was deemed sufficiently orthodox). It seems that at this time she acquired Raymond of Capua as her confessor and spiritual director.

After this visit, she began travelling with her followers throughout northern and central Italy advocating reform of the clergy and advising people that repentance and renewal could be done through "the total love for God." In Pisa, in 1375, she used what influence she had to sway that city and Lucca away from alliance with the anti-papal league whose force was gaining momentum and strength. She also lent her enthusiasm toward promoting the launch of a new crusade. It was in Pisa in 1375 that, according to Raymond of Capua's biography, she received the stigmata (visible, at Catherine's request, only to herself).

Physical travel was not the only way in which Catherine made her views known. From 1375 onward, she began dictating letters to scribes. These letters were intended to reach men and women of her circle, increasingly widening her audience to include figures in authority as she begged for peace between the republics and principalities of Italy and for the return of the Papacy from Avignon to Rome. She carried on a long correspondence with Pope Gregory XI, asking him to reform the clergy and the administration of the Papal States.

Toward the end of 1375, she returned to Siena, to assist a young political prisoner, Niccolò di Tuldo, at his execution. In June 1376 Catherine went to Avignon as ambassador of the Republic of Florence to make peace with the Papal States (on 31 March 1376 Gregory XI had placed Florence under interdict). She was unsuccessful and was disowned by the Florentine leaders, who sent ambassadors to negotiate on their own terms as soon as Catherine's work had paved the way for them. Catherine sent an appropriately scorching letter back to Florence in response. While in Avignon, Catherine also tried to convince Pope Gregory XI, the last Avignon Pope, to return to Rome. Gregory did indeed return his administration to Rome in January 1377; to what extent this was due to Catherine's influence is a topic of much modern debate.

Catherine returned to Siena and spent the early months of 1377 founding a women's monastery of strict observance outside the city in the old fortress of Belcaro. She spent the rest of 1377 at Rocca d'Orcia, about twenty miles from Siena, on a local mission of peace-making and preaching. During this period, in autumn 1377, she had the experience which led to the writing of her Dialogue and learned to write, although she still seems to have chiefly relied upon her secretaries for her correspondence.

Late in 1377 or early in 1378 Catherine again travelled to Florence, at the order of Gregory XI, to seek peace between Florence and Rome. Following Gregory's death in March 1378 riots, the revolts of the Ciompi, broke out in Florence on 18 June, and in the ensuing violence she was nearly assassinated. Eventually, in July 1378, peace was agreed between Florence and Rome; Catherine returned quietly to Florence.

In late November 1378, with the outbreak of the Western Schism, the new Pope, Urban VI, summoned her to Rome. She stayed at Pope Urban VI's court and tried to convince nobles and cardinals of his legitimacy, both meeting with individuals at court and writing letters to persuade others.

For many years she had accustomed herself to a rigorous abstinence. She received the Holy Eucharist almost daily. This extreme fasting appeared unhealthy in the eyes of the clergy and her own sisterhood. Her confessor, Raymond, ordered her to eat properly. But Catherine replied that she was unable to, describing her inability to eat as an infermità (illness). From the beginning of 1380, Catherine could neither eat nor swallow water. On 26 February she lost the use of her legs.

Catherine died in Rome, on 29 April 1380, at the age of thirty-three, having eight days earlier suffered a massive stroke which paralyzed her from the waist down. Her last words were, "Father, into Your Hands I commend my soul and my spirit."

Sources on her life

There is some internal evidence of Catherine's personality, teaching and work in her nearly four hundred letters, her Dialogue, and her prayers.

Much detail about her life has also, however, been drawn from the various sources written shortly after her death to promote her cult and canonization. Though much of the material is heavily hagiographic, it has been an important source for historians seeking to reconstruct Catherine's life. Various sources are particularly important, especially the works of Raymond of Capua, who was Catherine's spiritual director and close friend from 1374 to her death and himself became Master General of the Order in 1380. Raymond wrote what is known as the Legenda Major, his Life of Catherine which was completed in 1395, fifteen years after Catherine's death.

Another important work written after Catherine's death was Libellus de Supplemento (Little Supplement Book), written between 1412 and 1418 by Tommaso d'Antonio Nacci da Siena (commonly called Thomas of Siena, or Tommaso Caffarini); the work is an expansion of Raymond's Legenda Major making heavy use of the notes of Catherine's first confessor, Tommaso della Fonte, that do not survive anywhere else. Caffarini later published a more compact account of Catherine's life, the Legenda Minor.

From 1411 onward, Caffarini also coordinated the compiling of the Processus of Venice, the set of documents submitted as part of the process of canonisation of Catherine, which provides testimony from nearly all of Catherine's disciples. There is also an anonymous piece, "Miracoli della Beata Caterina" (Miracle of Blessed Catherine), written by an anonymous Florentine. A few other relevant pieces survive.

Works

Three genres of work by Catherine survive:
 Her major treatise is The Dialogue of Divine Providence. This had probably begun in October 1377 and was certainly finished by November 1378. Contemporaries of Catherine are united in asserting that much of the book was dictated while Catherine was in ecstasy, though it also seems possible that Catherine herself may then have re-edited many passages in the book. It is a dialogue between a soul who "rises up" to God and God himself.
 Catherine's letters are considered one of the great works of early Tuscan literature. Many of these were dictated, although she herself learned to write in 1377; 382 have survived. In her letters to the Pope, she often addressed him affectionately simply as Babbo ("Daddy"), instead of the formal form of address "Your Holiness". Other correspondents include her various confessors, among them Raymond of Capua, the kings of France and Hungary, the infamous mercenary John Hawkwood, the Queen of Naples, members of the Visconti family of Milan, and numerous religious figures. Approximately one third of her letters are to women.
 Twenty-six prayers of Catherine of Siena also survive, mostly composed in the last eighteen months of her life.

The University of Alcalá conserves a unique handwritten Spanish manuscript, while other available texts are printed copies collected by the National Library of France.

Theology
Catherine's theology can be described as mystical, and was employed toward practical ends for her own spiritual life or those of others. She used the language of medieval scholastic philosophy to elaborate her experiential mysticism. Interested mainly with achieving an incorporeal union with God, Catherine practiced extreme fasting and asceticism, eventually to the extent of living solely on the Eucharist every day. For Catherine, this practice was the means to fully realize her love of Christ in her mystical experience, with a large proportion of her ecstatic visions relating to the consumption or rejection of food during her life. She viewed Christ as a "bridge" between the soul and God and transmitted that idea, along with her other teachings, in her book The Dialogue. The Dialogue is highly systematic and explanatory in its presentation of her mystical ideas; however, these ideas themselves are not so much based on reason or logic as they are based in her ecstatic mystical experience.

In one of her letters she sent to her confessor, Raymund of Capua, she recorded this revelation from her conversation with Christ, in which he said: "Do you know what you are to Me, and what I am to you, my daughter? I am He who is, you are she who is not". This mystical concept of God as the wellspring of being is seen in the works and ideas of Aquinas and can be seen as a simplistic rendering of apotheosis and a more rudimentary form of the doctrine of divine simplicity. She describes God in her work, 'the Dialogues, as a "sea, in which we are the fish", the point being that the relationship between God and man should not be seen as man contending against the Divine and vice versa, but as God being the endless being that supports all things.

According to the writings attributed to Catherine, she had, in 1377, a vision in which the Virgin confirmed to her a thesis supported by the Dominican order, to which Catherine belonged: the Virgin said that she had been conceived with the original sin. The Virgin thus contradicted the future dogma of the Immaculate Conception. Cardinal Lambertini (later Pope Benedict XIV), in his treatise De servorum Dei beatificatione et de beatorum canonizatione, 1734-1738, cites theologians who believed that Catherine's directors or editors had falsified her words; he also cites Father Lancicius, who believed that Catherine had made a mistake as a result of preconceived ideas.

Veneration

She was buried in the (Roman) cemetery of Santa Maria sopra Minerva which lies near the Pantheon. After miracles were reported to take place at her grave, Raymond moved her inside the Basilica of Santa Maria sopra Minerva, where she lies to this day.

Her head however, was parted from her body and inserted in a gilt bust of bronze. This bust was later taken to Siena, and carried through that city in a procession to the Dominican church. Behind the bust walked Lapa, Catherine's mother, who lived until she was 89 years old. By then she had seen the end of the wealth and the happiness of her family, and followed most of her children and several of her grandchildren to the grave. She helped Raymond of Capua write his biography of her daughter, and said, "I think God has laid my soul athwart in my body, so that it can't get out." The incorrupt head and thumb were entombed in the Basilica of San Domenico at Siena, where they remain.

Pope Pius II, himself from Siena, canonized Catherine on 29 June 1461.

On 4 October 1970, Pope Paul VI named Catherine a Doctor of the Church; this title was almost simultaneously given to Teresa of Ávila (27 September 1970), making them the first women to receive this honour.

Initially however, her feast day was not included in the General Roman Calendar. When it was added in 1597, it was put on the day of her death, 29 April; however, because this conflicted with the feast of Saint Peter of Verona which also fell on 29 April, Catherine's feast day was moved in 1628 to the new date of 30 April. In the 1969 revision of the calendar, it was decided to leave the celebration of the feast of St Peter of Verona to local calendars, because he was not as well known worldwide, and Catherine's feast was restored to 29 April.

Catherine is remembered in the Church of England and in the Episcopal Church on 29 April.

Patronage
In his decree of 13 April 1866, Pope Pius IX declared Catherine of Siena to be a co-patroness of Rome. On 18 June 1939 Pope Pius XII named her a joint patron saint of Italy along with Francis of Assisi.

On 1 October 1999, Pope John Paul II made her one of Europe's patron saints, along with Teresa Benedicta of the Cross and Bridget of Sweden. She is also the patroness of the historically Catholic American woman's fraternity, Theta Phi Alpha.

Severed head
The people of Siena wished to have Catherine's body. A story is told of a miracle whereby they were partially successful: knowing that they could not smuggle her whole body out of Rome, they decided to take only her head which they placed in a bag. When stopped by the Roman guards, they prayed to Catherine to help them, confident that she would rather have her body (or at least part thereof) in Siena. When they opened the bag to show the guards, it appeared no longer to hold her head but to be full of rose petals.

Legacy
Catherine ranks high among the mystics and spiritual writers of the Catholic Church. She remains a greatly respected figure for her spiritual writings, and political boldness to "speak truth to power"—it being exceptional for a woman, in her time period, to have had such influence in politics and on world history.

Main sanctuaries
The main churches in honor of Catherine of Siena are:

 Santa Maria sopra Minerva in Rome: place where her body is preserved.
 Basilica of San Domenico in Siena: in this church the incorrupt head of Catherine of Siena is preserved.
  in Siena: complex of religious buildings built around the birthplace of Catherine.

Images

 Bibliography Modern editions and English translations'''
 The Italian critical edition of the Dialogue is Catherine of Siena, Il Dialogo della divina Provvidenza: ovvero Libro della divina dottrina, 2nd ed., ed. Giuliana Cavallini (Siena: Cantagalli, 1995). [1st edn, 1968] [Cavallini demonstrated that the standard division of the Dialogue in into four treatises entitled the 'Treatise on Discretion', 'On Prayer', 'On Providence', and 'On Obedience', was in fact a result of a misreading of the text in the 1579 edition of the Dialogue. Modern editors and translators, including , have followed Cavallini in rejecting this fourfold division.]
 The Italian critical edition of the 26 Prayers is Catherine of Siena, Le Orazioni, ed. Giuliana Cavallini (Rome: Cateriniane, 1978)
 The most recent Italian critical edition of the Letters is Antonio Volpato, ed, Le lettere di Santa Caterina da Siena: l'edizione di Eugenio Duprè Theseider e i nuovi problemi, (2002)

English translations of The Dialogue include:
 The Dialogue, trans. Suzanne Noffke, O.P. Paulist Press (Classics of Western Spirituality), 1980.
 The Dialogue of St. Catherine of Siena, TAN Books , 2009. 
 Phyllis Hodgson and Gabriel M Liegey, eds., The Orcherd of Syon, (London; New York: Oxford UP, 1966) [A Middle English translation of the Dialogo from the early fifteenth century, first printed in 1519].

The Letters are translated into English as:
  (Republished as The letters of Catherine of Siena, 4 vols, trans Suzanne Noffke, (Tempe, AZ: Arizona Center for Medieval and Renaissance Studies, 2000–2008))

The Prayers are translated into English as:
 The Prayers of Catherine of Siena, trans. Suzanne Noffke, 2nd edn 1983, (New York, 2001)

Raymond of Capua's Life was translated into English in 1493 and 1609, and in Modern English is translated as:
 

Letter Excerpts translated into English:
 Letter Excerpts, translations by Diana L. Villegas, Ph.D. from the Volpato critical edition.

See also
 Feast of Saint Catherine
 Biblioteca Comunale degli Intronati
 Mystical marriage of Saint Catherine
 Order of Preachers
 Saints and levitation
 Saint Catherine of Siena, patron saint archive
 Churches dedicated to Catherine of Siena
 War of the Eight Saints

References

Sources

 
 

Further reading
 
 
 Girolamo Gigli, ed., L'opere di Santa Caterina da Siena, 4 vols, (Siena e Lucca, 1707–1721)
 
 
 
 Carolyn Muessig, George Ferzoco, and Beverly Mayne Kienzle, eds., A Companion to Catherine of Siena, (Leiden: Brill, 2012),  / .

External links

 
 Letters of Catherine from Gutenberg
 
 Saint Catherine of Siena: Text with concordances and frequency list
 Drawn by Love, The Mysticism of Catherine of Siena
 St. Catherine of Siena at the Christian Iconography web site
 Divae Catharinae Senensis Vita 15th-century manuscript at Stanford Digital Repository''
 St Catherine statue – St Peter's Square Colonnade Saints
 
 Catherine of Siena's Spirituality

1347 births
1380 deaths
People from Siena
Dominican mystics
Lay Dominicans
Dominican theologians
14th-century philosophers
14th-century Italian Roman Catholic theologians
14th-century people of the Republic of Florence
14th-century Italian women writers
14th-century Italian Roman Catholic religious sisters and nuns
14th-century Christian mystics
Stigmatics
Italian hermits
Burials at Santa Maria sopra Minerva
Italian Roman Catholic saints
Dominican saints
14th-century Christian saints
Incorrupt saints
Doctors of the Church
Italian women philosophers
Catholic philosophers
Women Christian theologians
Christian ethicists
Roman Catholic mystics
Women religious writers
Female saints of medieval Italy
Anglican saints
Pre-Reformation saints of the Lutheran liturgical calendar
Ambassadors of the Republic of Florence
Neurological disease deaths in Lazio
Deaths from anorexia nervosa
Italian women ambassadors
Women mystics
Italian letter writers